The Tonga national badminton team represents Tonga in international badminton team competitions. The Tongan team debuted in the Oceania Badminton Championships mixed team event in 2016. The team finished in 5th place.

Participation in Oceania Badminton Championships

Mixed team

Current squad 
The following players were selected to represent Tonga at the 2016 Oceania Badminton Championships.

Male players
Lauti Naaniumotu
Metuisela Talakai Vainikolo

Female players
Lusia Ki Taulanga Faukafa
Litea Lupe Moe Valu Tatafu

References

Badminton
National badminton teams
Badminton in Tonga